The anterior median line is a sagittal line on the anterior of the head and torso running at midline.

External links
 Figure 50-1

Torso